Munjaneya Manju is a 1993 Indian Kannada-language romantic drama film, directed by P. H. Vishwanath and based on Eechanooru Jayalakshmi's novel of the same name. The film stars Ambareesh, Sudharani and Tara. The film, produced by Sandesh Nagaraj, was widely appreciated for its songs tuned by Hamsalekha and lead actors performances upon release. Tara won the Karnataka State Film Award for Best Supporting Actress for her performance in this film.

Plot
It is a topical crime thriller wrapped around a domestic misunderstanding melodrama. The film addresses real estate-related crime (a controversial subject in post-liberalisation Bangalore) as represented by a North Indian villain named Juneja. Madhav (Ambareesh), a lawyer with a mission, makes an enemy of Juneja when he refuses to take him as a client. At home, his wife Meera (Sudharani), pathologically sensitive to disturbing news, gets Madhav to promise to refuse dangerous cases. They help Meera's friend Hema (Tara) by hiring her for his office, but Meera suspects an affair and becomes jealous. Eventually, both the crime story and the domestic story find a joint resolution.

Cast 
 Ambareesh 
 Sudharani 
 Tara
 Ramesh Bhat
 Avinash
 K. S. Ashwath
 Tennis Krishna
 Honnavalli Krishna
 Rajendra Singh
 Ashalatha

Soundtrack 
The music of the film was composed and lyrics written by Hamsalekha and the entire soundtrack was received extremely well. Audio was released on Lahari Music.

Awards

 1993-94 - Karnataka State Film Award for Best Supporting Actress - Tara

References

External links 
 

1993 films
1990s Kannada-language films
1993 romantic drama films
Indian romantic drama films
Films based on Indian novels
Films scored by Hamsalekha